Neil Francis may refer to:

Neil Francis (broadcaster), DJ on Absolute Radio
Neil Francis (rugby union), Leinster and Ireland rugby player

See also